Haverhill Riverside Airport & Seaplane Base was an airfield operational in the mid-20th century in Haverhill, Massachusetts. The airport was owned and operated by William "Red" Slavit, who died in 2008. The airport code for Haverhill river side airport was MA04.

References

Defunct airports in Massachusetts
Buildings and structures in Haverhill, Massachusetts
Airports in Essex County, Massachusetts